Therese Csillag, or , born Stern; August 17, 1859 in Duna-Adony – July 9, 1925 in Budapest) was a Hungarian Jewish actress.

For many years she was a popular comedian at the National Theater in Budapest. At the age of 13 she attended the dramatic school in that city.

In 1879 she was engaged at the National Theater, where she played in ingénue rôles up to 1898. Nearly all Hungarian playwrights of her day wrote special rôles for her, among them being Gregor Csiky, in whose plays she always excelled. Since 1899 she was engaged at the Vígszínház in Budapest.

She embraced the Christian faith.

References 
 , by Isidore Singer, Max Weisz

Bibliography of Jewish Encyclopedia 
 Magyar Szalon, 1886

External links 
 Magyar Színházmûvészeti Lexikon / Csillag Teréz; Stern at mek.oszk.hu 

Hungarian Jews
1859 births
1925 deaths
Hungarian stage actresses
Jewish actresses
19th-century Hungarian actresses
20th-century Hungarian actresses